Get In Where You Fit In is the second album by One Thousand Motels, a collaboration project of Rat Scabies (The Damned) and Chris Constantinou (The Wolfmen, Sinead O'Connor, Adam Ant, The Mutants).

Musicians

The album Get In Where You Fit In, was recorded between London, Memphis and Palm Springs. At its creation, besides Chris Constantinou and Rat Scabies, participated also the musicians Sean Wheeler (Josh Homme, Lemmy Kilmister, Robby Krieger) as vocalist, the guitarist Hal Lindes (Dire Straits), Marc Franklin and Arthur Edmaiston from Memphis on Horns (Aretha Franklin, Isaac Hayes, Snoop Dogg, Stevie Wonder) and Jonathan Moore with the First Street Choir from Mississippi.  The musicians from London are the percussionist Preston Heyman (Kate Bush, Massive Attack, Terence Trent D'Arby), on harmonica Steve 'West' Weston (Roger Daltrey, Wilko Johnson), on slide guitar Dave Ahern, The Specials Brass Section & Su Robinson (The South Brass) and pianist Diz Watson (Dr. John).

Reception

The album was noticed for its blend of gospel, soul, funk, blues, and rock with Deep South nuances. The lyrics (Chris Constantinou) are also eclectic and the vocalist Sean Wheeler was remarked for his immersion in a variety of styles. It received a 7/10 rating from Vive Le Rock, also noticing Wheeler's voice lending itself to a divergence of styles.

Track listing

References

Rock albums by English artists
Universal Music Group albums
2021 albums